Urgedra is a genus of moths of the family Notodontidae. The genus contains about 20 described species occurring from Colombia south to Bolivia.

Selected species
Urgedra chlorolepis Miller & Thiaucourt, 2011
Urgedra deserta Miller & Thiaucourt, 2011
Urgedra janzeni Miller & Thiaucourt, 2011
Urgedra pavimenta Dognin, 1910
Urgedra quindinata Dognin, 1910
Urgedra striata (Druce, 1906)
Urgedra viridiflava Dognin, 1911

References

Notodontidae